Roads & Kingdoms is an independent online publication that explores culture and politics through food and travel. Founded in 2012 by veteran journalists Nathan Thornburgh and Matt Goulding, along with graphic designer Douglas Hughmanick, Roads & Kingdoms is based in Brooklyn, New York, and Barcelona, Spain. In 2017, Roads & Kingdoms won the James Beard Foundation Award for Publication of the Year. In 2019, Roads & Kingdoms won the National Magazine Award for Website, Service and Lifestyle.

Author and television host Anthony Bourdain was a partner and investor in the company from 2015 until his suicide in June 2018. His partnership with Roads & Kingdoms and CNN on the digital series Explore Parts Unknown won an Emmy in 2018.

History

Initially created as a Tumblr in late 2011, Roads & Kingdoms transitioned to a self-funded website in 2012. The company is named after The Book of Roads & Kingdoms, a geographical text by Abu Abdullah Al-Bakri, an 11th-century Andalusian geographer. Roads & Kingdoms publishes articles by writers from around the world, with a focus on featuring local voices. Their content includes long-form dispatches, food-focused articles, and experiential travel guides.

In 2015, Roads & Kingdoms co-founder Matt Goulding collaborated with Bourdain's imprint at HarperCollins on Rice Noodle Fish: Deep Travels Through Japan’s Food Culture, which would go on to become the first of three similar books produced by Roads & Kingdoms, including Grape Olive Pig (2016) and Pasta Pane Vino (2018). That year, Bourdain also became a partner, investor, and editor-at-large for Roads & Kingdoms’ website.

In early 2017, the site launched The Trip, a podcast focused on travel stories and hosted by Thornburgh, with cameos from Bourdain.  After Bourdain's suicide in 2018, “The Trip” shifted its main focus to weekly guest interviews.

Also in 2017, Roads & Kingdoms partnered with CNN to create the website and webseries for Bourdain's travel food show “Anthony Bourdain: Parts Unknown”, titled “Explore Parts Unknown,” for which they won a Primetime Emmy Award for Outstanding Short Form Nonfiction or Reality Series in 2018.  The site features travel notes, exclusive videos, and behind-the-scenes content from each destination Bourdain visited for Parts Unknown.

Name
The title of the magazine refers to a main work of the andalusian geographer and historian AbūʿUbaid al-Bakrī (1094–1014, arab أبو عبيد عبد الله بن عبد العزيز البكري). His work is characterized by a very objective description of Europe, Northern Africa, and the Arabian Peninsula. In Kitāb al-Masālik wa-l-Mamālik (1068; book of Roads and Kingdoms) al-Bakri writes about the people and their habits, as well about geography, climate and the capitals of the territories connected to the Mediterranean Sea.

Awards
 2019 National Magazine Award for Website, Service and Lifestyle 
 2018 Primetime Emmy for Outstanding Short Form Non-Fiction, Explore Parts Unknown
 2018 James Beard Foundation Award for Food Journalism Source
 2017 James Beard Foundation Award for Publication of the Year
 2017 Webby Award Source
 Winner of the 2017 IACP Award: Literary or Historical Food Writing, Grape, Olive, Pig
 Gourmand World Cookbook Award Winner: Culinary Travel, Grape, Olive, Pig
 Amazon Best Book of November 2016: Cookbooks, Food and Wine, Grape, Olive, Pig
 2016 Travel Book of the Year by the Society of American Travel Writers, Rice, Noodle, Fish
 Finalist for the 2016 IACP Awards: Literary Food Writing, Rice, Noodle, Fish
 Named one of the Financial Times' "Best Books of 2016", Rice, Noodle, Fish
 2013 Society of American Travel Writers Gold Award for Best Travel Journalism Site

References 

Websites about food and drink
James Beard Foundation Award winners
Mass media companies based in New York City
Mass media companies of the United States
American websites
Internet properties established in 2012
Primetime Emmy Award winners
International Association of Culinary Professionals award winners